Madonna di Campiglio is a village and a ski resort in northeast Italy. It is a frazione of the comune of Pinzolo.

Madonna is the main point of access to the Brenta Dolomites, with its famous via ferrata, with the ski lift to the Passo Groste taking one directly to the northern end of the via ferrata network.

Festivals and events
The village regularly hosts World Cup alpine skiing and snowboarding races. The Scuderia Ferrari Formula One and Ducati Corse MotoGP teams hold a media event in January at the resort. In summer the village hosts the Rally Stella Alpina, an Italian classic race. In cycling, the village has been the location for the finish of stages of the Giro d'Italia twice: in 1999 Marco Pantani won the stage whilst wearing the pink jersey, before being disqualified from the race after a blood test revealed a high haematocrit level, whilst in 2015 the stage was won by Mikel Landa.

Swedish alpine skier Ingemar Stenmark won his first world cup competition here on 17 December 1974.

References

External links 
 

Frazioni of Trentino
Ski areas and resorts in Italy